The term Number Pieces refers to a body of late compositions (40, or 41 if Seventeen was actually composed) by John Cage. Each piece is named after the number of performers involved: for instance, Seven is a piece for seven performers, One9 (read "One Nine") is the ninth work for one performer, and 1O1 is a piece for an orchestra of 101 musicians. The vast majority of these works were composed using Cage's time bracket technique: the score consists of short fragments (frequently just one note, with or without dynamics) and indications, in minutes and seconds, during which the fragment can start and by what time it should end. Time brackets can be fixed (e.g. from 1.15 to 2.00) or flexible (e.g. from anywhere between 1.15 and 1.45, and to anywhere between 2.00 and 2.30).

All of the Number Pieces were composed during the last six years of Cage's life, 1987–1992. Most are for traditional instruments, with six exceptions that range from works for rainsticks, the Japanese aerophone shō and conch shells to an electronically amplified version of 4′33″. This article lists all Number Pieces, organized by number of performers.

List of Number Pieces

One

Two

Three

Four

Five

Six to Twenty

Twenty to 108
Cage's late orchestral works are to be performed without a conductor.

Notes

Further reading
 Emmerik, Paul van (in collaboration with Herbert Henck and András Wilheim). "A John Cage Compendium"
 Haskins, Rob. 2004. "An Anarchic Society of Sounds": The Number Pieces of John Cage. Ph.D. Diss., Eastman School of Music, University of Rochester.
 Popoff, A. 2010. "John Cage’s Number Pieces: The Meta-Structure of Time-Brackets and the Notion of Time". Perspectives of New Music, pp. 65–84, 48/1.
 Popoff, A. 2011. Indeterminate music and probability spaces: The case of John Cage's number pieces, Springer Lecture Notes in Computer Science, Volume 6726 LNAI, pp. 220–229
 Popoff, A. 2015. A Statistical Approach to the Global Structure of John Cage’s Number Piece Five5, Springer Lecture Notes in Artificial Intelligence, Volume 9110 LNAI, pp. 231–236
 Weisser, B. 2003. " '... the whole paper would potentially be sound': Time-Brackets and the Number Pieces". Perspectives of New Music, pp.  176–225, 41/2.
 Musicage: Cage Muses on Words, Art, Music, editor: Joan Retallack, Wesleyan University Press 1996,

External links
 John Cage Database – Worklist, includes a complete catalogue of Cage's music, details and lists of recordings for all pieces.
 John Cage Complete Works, hosted and developed by the John Cage Trust
 Rob Haskins: Program and Liner Notes, includes a number of essays on Number Pieces in general, One4, One9, Two2, Two3, Two4, Four, Four4, Twenty-Nine and 108.
 James Pritchett: Liner Notes: One8 for cello and curved bow
 Publication release notice by C. F. Peters, New York: One13 for cello with curved bow and 3 loud-speakers

Compositions by John Cage
Music with dedications